The Black Legion was a white supremacist terrorist organization which was active in the Midwestern United States during the Great Depression of the 1930s. It split off from the Ku Klux Klan. According to historian Rick Perlstein, the FBI estimated that its membership numbered "at 135,000, including a large number of public officials, including Detroit’s police chief." Historian Peter H. Amann put the number at between 60,000-100,000, while John Earl Haynes said that it at most only a few hundred members. In 1936, the group was suspected of having killed as many as 50 people, according to the Associated Press, including Charles Poole, an organizer for the federal Works Progress Administration.

At the time of Poole's murder, the Associated Press described the organization as "A group of loosely federated night-riding bands operating in several States without central discipline or common purpose beyond the enforcement by lash and pistol of individual leaders' notions of 'Americanism'." Based on testimony which was heard during the trial of Poole's killer, Dayton Dean, Wayne County Prosecutor Duncan McRae conducted a widespread investigation and prosecuted another 37 Legion men who were suspected of committing murders and assaults. All of them were convicted and sent to prison. These cases and associated negative publicity resulted in a rapid decline in Legion membership. The sensational cases inspired two related films, one starring Humphrey Bogart, and two radio show episodes which were produced from 1936 to 1938.

Background
In 1915, the release of D. W. Griffith's film, The Birth of a Nation, inspired a revival of the Ku Klux Klan (KKK) in Atlanta, Georgia. Gradually, the new Klan, often appealing to migrants to cities as a fraternal order, established new chapters nationwide, particularly in urban areas, including the rapidly changing cities of the industrialized Midwest. Throughout the 1920s, cities such as Detroit, Cleveland and Indianapolis were centers of an increase in Klan membership and activity in local chapters, in reaction to high rates of immigration from Eastern and Southern Europe, and the internal migration of African Americans from the Southern United States. A sexual scandal in the Ku Klux Klan's national leadership in 1925, and local actions by opponents who were determined to unmask the secrecy of Klan members, caused the Klan's membership to drop rapidly through the late 1920s.

Initially, the Black Legion was part of the Klan. It was founded by William Shepard as a paramilitary force which was called the Black Guard in the 1920s, in the Appalachian region of East Central Ohio. Its original mission was to protect regional officers of the KKK. The Black Legion formed chapters all across Ohio, and it expanded into other areas of the Midwestern United States. One of its self-described leaders, Virgil "Bert" Effinger, lived and worked in Lima, Ohio.

Like the KKK, the Black Legion was largely made up of native-born, working-class, Protestant white men in the Midwest. These men feared the rapid social changes underway and resented competition with immigrants such as Italians and Jews. They also feared migrants in the industrial economy of major cities, such as Detroit.  Their list of enemies "included all immigrants, Catholics, Jews and blacks, nontraditional Protestant faiths, labor unions, farm cooperatives and various fraternal groups." Membership was concentrated in Michigan and Ohio.

Black Legion members created a network for jobs and influence. In addition, as a secret vigilante group, the Legion members operated in gangs in order to enforce their view of society, sometimes attacking immigrants to intimidate them at work, or to enforce their idea of moral behavior. They generally opposed socialism and union organizing. They had a reputation for frequent violence against alleged enemies, whether political or social. From 1933 to 1936, they were rumored to be responsible for some unsolved deaths that had officially been attributed to suicide or unknown perpetrators.

In 1931, a chapter of the Black Legion was formed in Highland Park, Michigan, by Arthur F. Lupp, Sr. of that community, who styled himself its major general. Throughout and perhaps fueled by the economic and social upheaval of the Great Depression, the Black Legion continued to expand across Michigan until the mid-1930s, when its estimated membership peaked at between 20,000 and 30,000. In general, Black Legion members in the state were native-born Protestant men. One-third of its members lived in the city of Detroit, which had also been a strong center of KKK activity in the 1920s.  The Michigan Legion was organized along military lines, with 5 brigades, 16 regiments, 64 battalions, and 256 companies. It boasted of a membership of one million Legionnaires in Michigan, but observers estimated that it had between 20,000 and 30,000 members. One-third of them were located in Detroit, with many living in Highland Park.

Recruitment 
The Black Legion's tactics were "to lure potential recruits to a meeting—kidnap them, if necessary—then threaten them if they didn’t join and [make them] swear they’d never tell anybody." They would also beat up members if they threatened to quit. The Legion wanted sports figures as members. It was looking into recruiting Mickey Cochrane, player-manager for the Detroit Tigers. He had a nervous breakdown in 1936 and removed himself from the team over Black Legion suspicions. One of these Legion members, Dayton Dean, broke their code and told the authorities of Black Legion's illegal activities. Dayton Dean participated in two of the murders that the Black Legion committed.

Murder of Charles Poole
On May 12, 1936, Charles A. Poole, a federal organizer for the Works Progress Administration, was kidnapped from his home by a gang of Black Legion members. They claimed that Poole, a French Catholic married to a Protestant woman, beat his wife, and that they intended to punish him for it. He was shot and killed that night by Dayton Dean.

Wayne County Prosecutor Duncan McRae, who had been reported by the Detroit Times as a member of the Black Legion, worked to restore his public reputation and vowed to bring the killers of Poole to justice. Authorities arrested and prosecuted a gang of twelve men affiliated with the Legion. Dayton Dean pleaded guilty and testified against numerous other members; ten others were convicted of the murder, nine by a jury and one in a bench trial. One man was acquitted. Dean and the others convicted were all sentenced to life in prison.

Dean provided considerable testimony to authorities about other activities of the Black Legion. Prejudiced primarily against Catholics, particularly Italian and Slavic immigrants, he and his collaborators had never learned that Becky Poole had a great-grandmother who was African American.

Prosecutions for earlier murders
Dean's testimony and other evidence stimulated investigations by Prosecutor McRae. He gained indictments into a series of other murders and attempted murders in the Detroit area during the previous three years. In total, another 37 men of the Legion were prosecuted for these related crimes, convicted, and sentenced to prison terms. The trials revealed the wide network of Black Legion members in local governments, particularly in Highland Park. For instance, member N. Ray Markland had served as mayor of Highland Park. Members also included a chief of police and a city councilman in the suburb, in addition to persons in civil service jobs. Following the convictions and publicity, membership in the Legion dropped quickly; its reign of terror ended in the Detroit area.

Among the cases, the prosecutor indicted Black Legion members for the 1935 murder of Silas Coleman of Detroit. The African-American man had been found killed outside Putnam Township, Michigan, on May 26, 1935, nearly a year before Poole's abduction and murder.

Members were also indicted for a 1933 conspiracy to murder Arthur Kingsley, a Highland Park publisher of a community paper, who was a candidate for mayor in 1934. They had planned to shoot him in 1933 because he ran against Markland, a Legionnaire politician. Sixteen Black Legion members were indicted in Kingsley's case, including "two factory policemen, a police officer, and several Highland Park city employees. At the time of his arrest, Markland was employed as an investigator in the office of Wayne County Prosecutor McCrea." Nine members were convicted in this case, including Markland and Arthur F. Lupp Sr., then a milk inspector for the Detroit Board of Health. Lupp was said to have founded the Legion in Michigan by setting up the chapter in Highland Park.

Through these cases, authorities learned that Mayor William Voisine of Ecorse, Michigan had been identified as a potential target of the Legion; its members had resented his hiring African Americans for city jobs. McRae prosecuted and gained convictions of a total of 37 Legion members on these and related charges, beyond those charged in the Poole case. All received prison terms, markedly reducing the power of the Black Legion in Detroit and Michigan.

Among other murders linked to the Black Legion were two labor organizers, both from eastern Europe:
 George Marchuk, Secretary of the Auto Workers Union in Lincoln Park, was found dead on December 22, 1933, with a bullet in his head.
 John Bielak, an A. F. of L. organizer in the Hudson Motor Car Company plant, who had led a drive for a wage increase, "was found riddled with bullets on March 15, 1934, on a road about ten miles from Monroe, Michigan."

The "arson squad" of the Black Legion confessed to the August 1934 burning of the farm of labor organizer William Mollenhauer, which was located in Oakland County, Michigan, near Pontiac. Members also described numerous plans to disrupt legitimate political meetings and similar activities.

The cases received international media coverage. For instance, the Poole case and the secret Black Legion were reported by The Sydney Morning Herald of Australia on May 25, 1936.

Representation in other media

Hollywood, radio and, later TV, responded to the lurid nature of the Legion by producing works that referred to it.
 Legion of Terror (1936) starred Ward Bond and Bruce Cabot, and it was based on this group.
 Black Legion (1937), a feature film starring Humphrey Bogart, was based on the events which led to the murder of Charles Poole, but the details of the case and the names of the people who were involved in it were changed in the film. It depicted the devastating effect of domestic terrorist groups like the Black Legion on an ordinary American man, his family, his neighbors, and his coworkers. The National Board of Review named Black Legion the best film of 1937, and it named Humphrey Bogart the best actor for his work on the film.
 True Detective Mysteries, a radio show which was based on the magazine which had the same title, broadcast an episode on April 1, 1937, which directly referred to the Black Legion and Poole's murder.
 The radio show The Shadow, with Orson Welles in the title role, broadcast an episode on March 20, 1938, titled "The White Legion"; the group which was described in the episode was loosely based on the Black Legion.

Since the late 20th century, the group has received renewed historic and popular attention.
 Malcolm X and Alex Haley collaborated on The Autobiography of Malcolm X (1965). Malcolm noted that the Legion had been active in Lansing, Michigan, where his family lived. Malcolm X was six years old when his father died in 1931; he believed that his father was killed by the Black Legion.
 In 1998, the TV series History's Mysteries presented an episode about the group entitled "Terror in the Heartland: The Black Legion".
 Author Tom Stanton's 2016 nonfiction book Terror in the City of Champions (2016) details the group's activities.
 The TV series Damnation (2017) features the group.

References
13. Littlefield, Bill. "The Secret Society That Terrorized Detroit During The City's Greatest Sports Era." WBUR. September 16, 2016. Accessed December 03, 2018. http://www.wbur.org/onlyagame/2016/09/16/detroit-black-legion-terror-in-the-city-of-champions.

External links
 "The Murder that Brought Down the Black Legion" , Detroit News, 5 August 1997
 Richard Bak, "The Dark Days of the Black Legion", Hour Detroit Magazine, March 2009
 FBI FOIA page on the Black Legion, FBI, 23 June 2006
 George Morris, "The Black Legion Rides", New York: Workers Library Publishers, August 1936; full text at Internet Archive: pamphlet about the Black Legion in Detroit and Michigan

1920s establishments in Ohio
Organizations established in the 1920s
1930s disestablishments in Ohio
Organizations disestablished in the 1930s
African-American history between emancipation and the civil rights movement
Anti-Catholicism in the United States
Anti-Catholic organizations
Ku Klux Klan organizations
History of racism in Ohio
Former gangs in Detroit
Political masks
Vigilantism in the United States
Right-wing militia organizations in the United States
Highland Park, Michigan
History of the Midwestern United States
Great Depression in the United States
Ku Klux Klan in Michigan